Ethnos is a Greek weekly newspaper first published in 1913.

History
The newspaper was first published in 1913 with a Venizelist political thesis. Always in the progressive political spectrum, it supported later Georgios Papandreou and Center Union. In 1970, during the Greek military junta of 1967-74, it was forced to stop publishing. In 1981, Dimitris Varos relaunched it as a colour tabloid.

The newspaper was owned for years by Pegasus Publishing SA. In 2017 was sold to Dimera Media Investments, owned by Ivan Savvidis. From September 2017 to March 2018 publisher was Dimitris Maris. Dimera reportedly acquired the two Ethnos titles (daily and Sunday editions) for 3 million euros.

On August 9th 2020 the Sunday edition ceased circulation following the daily edition which stopped circulating on July 31st 2019.

The publication continued online, with unique content, and more than 150 daily news reports, opinions, and deep analytical articles. In March 2020, 7,348,731 unique users visited the website, placing “Ethnos.gr” in the top ten of most popular news websites in Greece.

References

Newspapers established in 1913
Publications disestablished in 1970
Publications established in 1981
Publications disestablished in 2020
1913 establishments in Greece
1970 disestablishments in Greece
1981 establishments in Greece
2020 disestablishments in Greece
Newspapers published in Athens
Greek-language newspapers
Daily newspapers published in Greece